The ACTRA Awards were first presented in 1972 to celebrate excellence in Canada's television and radio industries. Organized and presented by the Association of Canadian Television and Radio Artists, which represented performers, writers and broadcast journalists, the Nellie statuettes were presented annually until 1986. They were the primary national television award in Canada until 1986, when they were taken over by the Academy of Canadian Cinema and Television to create the new Gemini Awards, although ACTRA continued to present Nellies in radio categories.

The ACTRA Awards were then revived in 2003 as a local film industry award, separately presented by each of ACTRA's regional chapters to honour performances in local film and television production.

History 
ACTRA began presenting the John Drainie Award for distinguished lifetime contribution in broadcasting in 1968, before launching a comprehensive program for television and radio awards in 1972. The 1st ACTRA Awards that year only presented the Drainie Award alongside the new Earle Grey Award for actors and Gordon Sinclair Award for broadcast journalism,  with its roster of categories beginning to expand the following year.

By 1978, there began to be talk in the industry of a "Nellie curse", as several broadcast personalities in the past couple of years had been fired or had their shows cancelled very soon after winning an ACTRA award. The same year also saw the first widespread complaints about ACTRA's nomination criteria, which limited honours in most categories to ACTRA members; even if ACTRA members had collaborated with non-ACTRA members, then only the ACTRA member could be considered for nomination.

That year further saw the public revelation of an unconfirmed but longstanding industry rumour that if Lloyd Robertson had won the award for Best News Broadcaster at the 4th ACTRA Awards in 1975, elements in the audience were planning to pie him in the face just to see if they could cause the normally unflappable Robertson to lose his composure.

By 1980, the CTV network decided to boycott the awards, on the grounds that the members-only rule biased the awards in favour of CBC Television productions; the issue arose because the CBC produced most of its programming directly, and thus nearly all CBC programming involved ACTRA members, while CTV broadcast far more programming from independent non-ACTRA producers. The boycott, which continued for several years thereafter, sparked discussions through the early 1980s about how to improve the management and delivery of Canadian television awards. 

In this era, there was also significant concern about the fact that ACTRA only presented awards in categories such as acting, writing and journalism, but had no categories for television crafts such as cinematography or editing, as well as a controversy when ACTRA rejected the CBC's proposal of Dan Aykroyd as host, on the grounds that he was working in the United States and not an active ACTRA member.

By 1983, the Academy of Canadian Cinema and Television's experimental Bijou Awards, which had been presented for the first time in 1981, were being proposed to replace the ACTRA Awards, but this did not proceed at this time; ultimately, responsibility for presenting the Canadian television awards was transferred to the Academy's new Gemini Awards in 1986.

Awards transferred to the Academy included the John Drainie Award, a lifetime achievement award for distinguished contributions to Canadian broadcasting, and the Earle Grey Award, which transitioned from ACTRA's award for best performance in a television film into the Academy's lifetime achievement award for acting.

Revival
Beginning in 2002, ACTRA took management of the John Drainie Award back from the Academy, presenting it thereafter at the Banff Television Festival.

On the 60th anniversary of the national union in 2003, now renamed the Alliance of Canadian Cinema, Television and Radio Artists and representing only performers, the ACTRA Awards were resurrected in several of its branches across Canada as a local film and television award, presented by the organization's local chapters in Toronto, Montreal, Ottawa, British Columbia, Alberta, Saskatchewan, Manitoba, Newfoundland and Labrador and the Maritimes to honour achievements in film and television within their own regions. Depending on the level of production activity in their respective regions, some chapters of ACTRA present their awards annually, while others present their awards every two years.

However, the revived ACTRA Awards program also includes a national Award of Excellence, presented to an actor to honour their lifetime achievements; the national award of excellence is most commonly presented to an actor who is working in Hollywood, and would thus not be eligible for a regional chapter's local award of excellence. However, the national award of excellence is not necessarily always presented annually.

Some awards are handed out for performances, while others are given for union activism and contributions to the industry.

National ACTRA ceremonies

National Award of Excellence recipients
2003 — Leslie Nielsen
2004 — Lloyd Bochner
2005 — Tonya Williams
2007 — Kiefer Sutherland
2009 — Sandra Oh
2010 — Eugene Levy
2011 — Bruce Greenwood
2015 — Jason Priestley
2016 — Neve Campbell
2017 — Kim Coates
2018 — Molly Parker
2019 — Jay Baruchel
2020 — Catherine O'Hara

Regional awards ceremonies

UBCP/ACTRA Awards (Vancouver)

ACTRA Montreal Awards

ACTRA Awards in Toronto

See also

 Canadian television awards

References

Awards established in 1972
Canadian film awards
Predecessors of the Canadian Screen Awards